Persistence hunting is pursuit until the prey can no longer flee and succumbs to exhaustion or heat stroke.

History and definition 

Some researchers have insisted that the point of persistence hunting is not to induce exhaustion but specifically to induce heat stroke. However, a decade later, they understood persistence hunting to include pursuit until injury or heat stroke or exhaustion; and driving prey to ambushes, natural traps like cliffs and rivers and ravines, or man-made ditches and stakes. There do not seem to be descriptions which take account of heat dissipation theory.

Hunters

Startled animals respond in characteristic ways that may be effective against animal predators. People learn how prey respond and plan (and prepare themselves) to overcome that response. They learn how to monitor their own condition and stay within their limits, while pushing the prey animal beyond its physiological limits.

Research and discussion about persistence hunting has often been in the context of providing reciprocal support for the Endurance running hypothesis. However, hunts are not intended to be a fair contest of endurance. On the contrary, hunters use their knowledge to put the prey animal at every disadvantage. Even proponents "agree that persistence hunting is not practiced by the Hadza and only rarely by Bushmen and other foragers".

Cheetahs as prey 

Cheetahs near Wajir were preying on Mr Hassan's goat herd each morning. He waited a few hours until the hottest part of the day, when Cheetahs typically rest in the shade. Mr Hassan and 3 youths chased about  until they captured the 2 cheetahs.

Cheetahs at hunt have exceptional speed, acceleration and deceleration — for a few seconds. A typical chase only lasts a minute and exhausts the cheetah so much that it is forced to rest. On a typical day a cheetah would make a single chase covering 200 to 500 m.

Deer as prey 

In Copper Canyon once fresh tracks were found, the deer were chased into a trap and clubbed. Either a natural trap: a river, cave, ravine, cliff or rocky ground to injure the animals' hooves; or a man-made trap of sharpened wooden stakes set into the ground and hidden with leaves. In other words the Rarámuri commonly planned and prepared game drives.

Less commonly the deer were tracked and chased to exhaustion. The hunters walked and ran at a "steady pace", a gradual jogging pace. They prepared by drinking pinole and eating a meal.

Duiker as prey 

Hunting by walking was successful for duiker, steenbok and even kudu; during the hot dry season, in the central Kalahari. Fresh duiker hoof tracks were followed at a steady walk for 3 hours. Even when the animal was seen, rather than make any effort to keep it in sight, the hunter continued along the hoof tracks. The duiker was caught standing head lowered and tongue hanging out. The hunter walked up to it and clubbed it with a digging stick.

Kudu as prey 

Several kudu hunts were performed, in the central Kalahari, for the documentary television program The Life of Mammals.
  The hunters prepared by drinking as much water as they could. The hunters searched for fresh tracks using a four-wheel-drive vehicle until they saw kudu and then hunted on foot; sometimes walking, sometimes running. The objective was to illustrate how they would perform persistence hunting, not to demonstrate that they could — so the hunters refilled their water bottles from the vehicle during the hunt.

Persistence hunting is chosen when conditions are right: when there are prey animals already weakened by illness or injury or hunger or thirst; when tracking will be easier. Weaker kudu usually break away from the herd to hide. Predators may follow the stronger scent of the herd, giving the hidden animal a chance to escape. With that knowledge hunters look for tracks away from the herd and follow the weaker animal.

Pronghorn as prey 

Modern examples:

 The pronghorn run very quickly for a quarter mile, sometimes a half mile, stop and stare until the runners catch up, and then take off again. The animals run in a broad clockwise arc, so the runners can take a shortcut straight across the arc and get within 50 yards. But the herd splits and merges until they can't tell whether they're chasing animals that have run for two minutes or 20 minutes or two hours. They chase on and off for two days without success.

 The fastest runner has a 2:10 marathon and the slowest a 2:45. They have come together to chase pronghorn across the New Mexico short-grass prairie on a  day. After trailing a pronghorn buck for two hours they abruptly come across the animal 50 feet away, with a group of does. They close to 25 feet and the animal sprints away. After another five miles it merges with a herd and slips away.

 The fifth year trying to run down a pronghorn and after a dozen miles, even running sub-six-minute miles, they lose him. He blames the lack of heat and too many animals. A big herd gives opportunities for them to splinter into smaller groups, then rejoin again. Even if it had been 100 degrees, he probably wouldn’t have been able to separate one from the group.

Why it works

 The hunter chooses a pace they can maintain; the prey animal flees fast to escape a predator animal.
 The hunter carries water; the prey animal has no water.
 The hunter follows the hoof tracks of a single individual; the prey animal cannot stay hidden or rest in the herd.

African wild dogs

African wild dogs have been described as cooperative persistence predators and there's been a popular perception of large packs chasing down large antelope over long distances across open grass plains.

More recent observations from a different area, show they hunt opportunistically with short high-speed chases after medium-size prey, and rely on sharing kills.
 The problem of heat dissipation may limit prey animals more than African wild dogs. On hotter days, successful chases were shorter. Temperature differences did not seem to influence the dawn and dusk pattern of wild dog hunts; instead, the relevant factors may include light conditions and the need to avoid scavengers.

See also
 Tracking (hunting)
 Endurance running hypothesis

References 

Hunting methods
History of hunting
Human evolution
Behavioral ecology
Predation